A style guide is a set of standards for the writing, formatting, and design of documents. A book-length style guide is often called a style manual or manual of style (MoS or MOS). (Typical examples include the Chicago Manual of Style and the AMA Manual of Style.) A short style guide, of several pages or several dozen pages, is often called a style sheet, although that term also has multiple other meanings. The standards documented in a style guide can be applied either for general use, or be required usage for an individual publication, a particular organization, or a specific field.

A style guide establishes standard style requirements to improve communication by ensuring consistency both within a document, and across multiple documents. Because practices vary, a style guide may set out standards to be used in areas such as punctuation, capitalization, citing sources, formatting of numbers and dates, table appearance and other areas. The style guide may require certain best practices in writing style, usage, language composition, visual composition, orthography, and typography. For academic and technical documents, a guide may also enforce the best practice in ethics (such as authorship, research ethics, and disclosure) and compliance (technical and regulatory). For translations, a style guide may be used to enforce consistent grammar choices such as tenses, formality levels in tones, and localization decisions such as units of measurements.

Style guides are specialized in a variety of ways, from the general use of a broad public audience, to a wide variety of specialized uses, such as for students and scholars of various academic disciplines, medicine, journalism, the law, government, business in general, and specific industries. The term house style refers to the styling defined by the style guide of a particular publisher or other organization.

Varieties

Style guides vary widely in scope and size, and writers working in most large industries or professional sectors reference a specific style guide, written for their industry or sector when writing very specialized document types. These guides are, for the most part, only relevant and useful for peer-to-peer specialist documentation or to help writers working in specific industries and/or sectors communicate highly technical information in scholarly articles or industry white papers. 

Professional reference style guides from different countries give authoritative advice on their language and how to use it, such as the New Oxford Style Manual from Oxford University Press, UK and The Chicago Manual of Style from the University of Chicago Press, US; Australia and Canada both have style guides created by their governments which are available online.

Sizes
This variety in scope and length is enabled by the cascading of one style over another, in a way analogous to how styles cascade in web development and in desktop cascade over CSS styles.

A short style guide is often called a style sheet. A comprehensive guide tends to be long and is often called a style manual or manual of style (MOS or MoS).  In many cases, a project such as one book, journal, or monograph series typically has a short style sheet that cascades over the somewhat larger style guide of an organization such as a publishing company, whose content is usually called house style. Most house styles, in turn, cascade over an industry-wide or profession-wide style manual that is even more comprehensive. Some examples of these industry style guides include the following:
 ACS style, AMA style, and CSE style for various hard sciences
 AP Stylebook for journalism and all types of internal and external corporate communications
 APA style and ASA style for the social sciences
 Bluebook style for law
 The Chicago Manual of Style (CMOS) and Oxford style for academic writing and publishing
 MLA style for language and literature studies, and normatively in American secondary education
 USGPO style and AGPS style for government publications

Finally, these reference works cascade over the orthographic norms of the language in use (for example, English orthography for English-language publications). This, of course, may be subject to national variety, such as the different varieties of British English, American English, Canadian English and Australian English.

Topics 
Some style guides focus on specific topic areas such as graphic design, including typography. Website style guides cover a publication's visual and technical aspects along with text.

Style guides that cover usage may suggest ways of describing people that avoid racism, sexism, and homophobia. Guides in specific scientific and technical fields cover nomenclature, which specifies names or classifying labels that are preferred because they are clear, standardized, and ontologically sound (e.g., taxonomy, chemical nomenclature, and gene nomenclature).

Updating
Most style guides are revised from time to time to accommodate changes in conventions and usage. The frequency of updating and the revision control are determined by the subject. For style manuals in reference work format, new editions typically appear every 1 to 20 years. For example, the AP Stylebook is revised annually, and, as of 2021, the Chicago, APA, and ASA manuals are in their 17th, 7th, and 4th editions, respectively. Many house styles and individual project styles change more frequently, especially for new projects.

See also

 Citation style
 Graphic charter
 Diction
 Documentation
 Disputed usage
 English writing style
 List of style guides
 Prescription and description
 Sentence spacing in language and style guides
 Spelling
 Style sheet (disambiguation)

References

External links

 But the stylebook says ... – Blog post about stylebook abuse, by Bill Walsh of The Washington Post
 Handouts about writing style guides, from a conference of the American Copy Editors Society in 2007
 
 
 Language Log » Searching 43 stylebooks

 
Bibliography
Communication design
Design
Graphic design
Technical communication